Phalonidia linharesa is a species of moth of the family Tortricidae. It is found in Espírito Santo, Brazil.

The wingspan is about 7 mm. The ground colour of the forewings is cream, slightly tinged with brownish and glossy along the edges of the markings. The markings are brownish yellow. The hindwings are brownish cream, but brownish on the periphery.

Etymology
The species name refers to Linhares, the type locality.

References

Moths described in 2007
Phalonidia